Cheyabel (also Romanized as Cheyābel; also known as Qal‘eh-ye ‘Alī Bakhsh, Chaqābal, Chaqāwal, Chīābol, Choghālbal-e ‘Alībakhsh, and Qal‘eh ‘Ali Bakhsh) is a village in Beyranvand-e Jonubi Rural District, Bayravand District, Khorramabad County, Lorestan Province, Iran. At the 2006 census, its population was 37, in 8 families.

References 

Towns and villages in Khorramabad County